There have been six business routes of Interstate 96 (I-96) in the US state of Michigan. There are two business loops designated Business Loop Interstate 96 (BL I-96): one through Lansing and one through Howell. Both follow the old route of US Highway 16 (US 16), with appropriate connections to I-96. There are three former business spurs that were designated Business Spur Interstate 96 (BS I-96). One connected to the carferry docks in Muskegon, running concurrently with part of Business US 31 (Bus. US 31) along former US 16, but it has been eliminated. The second spur ran into downtown Portland until it was decommissioned in 2007. Two routes in the Detroit area—a loop through Farmington and a spur into Detroit—both using Grand River Avenue, and meeting at the temporary end of I-96 near Purdue Avenue, were eliminated when I-96 was moved to the completed Jeffries Freeway in 1977. The Farmington business route is still state-maintained as an unsigned highway, while the Detroit business route remained unsigned until it was decommissioned in 2016 and replaced by an extension of M-5.


Muskegon

Business Spur Interstate 96 (BS I-96) was a business spur of I-96 in the Muskegon area. It was formerly the route of US 16 from the carferry docks in Muskegon to the end of I-96 in Norton Shores. The spur ran concurrently with M-46 southeasterly from the docks along Mart Street and Sixth Street. At the intersections with the one-way pairing of Webster Avenue (southbound) and Muskegon Avenue (northbound) in downtown Muskegon, BS I-96 separated from M-46 and turned southward to follow Bus. US 31 while M-46 turned northward along Bus. US 31. From there, BS I-96/Bus. US 31 ran southwesterly along the one-way pair for a few blocks before the two directions of traffic merged onto the north–south section of Seaway Drive southwest of downtown. The business route then ran due south along Seaway Drive, exiting Muskegon at Sherman Drive and crossing onto a section of the Norton Shores–Muskegon Heights city line. South of Norton Avenue, Seaway Drive turned eastward along the southern edge of Muskegon Heights. BS I-96/Bus. US 31 ran along the northern edge of Mona Lake and crossed the Black Creek in Norton Shores. Southwest of the lake, the business route came to an end at the interchange along US 31 that marked the western starting point of I-96.

When the state highway system was first signposted in 1919, the east–west highway from Grand Haven through Nunica to Detroit was assigned the M-16 designation; there was no state highway between Muskegon and Nunica, This was redesignated US 16 in 1926. By 1934, a state highway numbered M-126 was designated between Muskegon and Nunica,  and this was replaced by a rerouted US 16 in 1940. On December 12, 1962, the freeway that is now I-96 was initially completed across the state of Michigan from Muskegon to the Detroit area. After this completion, US 16 was decommissioned. West of Grand Rapids, the freeway was originally I-196, and the route of former US 16 past the end of the freeway to the ferry dock was numbered BS I-196. The freeway was redesignated I-96 on October 21, 1963, and BS I-196 became BS I-96 thereafter. In 1970, the SS Milwaukee Clipper across Lake Michigan ceased to run. In 1984, the section of BS I-96/M-46 between the ferry docks and Bus. US 31 was turned over to local control. The BS I-96 designation was decommissioned and removed from its concurrency with Bus. US 31, and M-46 was truncated to end at its other junction with Bus. US 31.

Major intersections

Portland

Business Spur Interstate 96 (BS I-96) was a business spur of I-96 through the city of Portland. The western terminus was at the corner of Grand River Avenue and Kent Street in downtown Portland. From there the highway followed Grand River Avenue eastward through downtown and past businesses roughly parallel to the Looking Glass River. East of downtown, the spur turned southeasterly past another commercial area. The highway's eastern terminus was at exit 77 south of the city.

When the state highway system was first signposted in 1919, the east–west highway across the Lower Peninsula through Portland to Detroit was assigned the M-16 designation, This was redesignated US 16 in 1926. The section of US 16 through Portland was decommissioned on March 7, 1960. It would remain under local control until the first quarter-mile (0.4 km) section was transferred to state control on September 18, 1978. The route was first marked on state highway maps in 1982 along the full mile and a quarter (2.0 km). It was transferred back to local control on October 31, 2007.

Major intersections

Lansing

Business Loop Interstate 96 (BL I-96) is a business loop of I-96 through the city of Lansing. The western terminus is at I-96's exit 90 northwest of Lansing in Watertown Township in Clinton County near the I-96/I-69 junction. From there, it follows Grand River Avenue under I-96. East of I-96, BL I-96 intersects Francis Road, which provides access to I-69, and then passes under I-69. Grand River Avenue is three lanes, one in each direction divided by a central turn lane, and runs past light industrial areas, crossing into Lansing and Eaton County near the Capital Region International Airport. The area around the airport is commercial, but east of there North Grand River Avenue runs through residential neighborhoods. Near the intersection with Martin Luther King Jr Boulevard, the business loop runs along the Grand River and then BL I-96 turns eastward on North Street to an interchange with Cedar and Larch streets. The business loop turns and splits onto the one-way pairing of the three-lane Cedar (southbound) and Larch (northbound). As it runs southward, the highway runs parallel to the Grand River through Old Town Lansing. At Oakland Avenue (westbound) and Saginaw Avenue (eastbound), BL I-96 intersects the two one-way streets that carry BL I-69. It continues south through the eastern edge of downtown Lansing.

Near Cooley Law School Stadium at the intersection with Michigan Avenue, BL I-96 meets the Capitol Loop, Lansing's third business loop. The two highways run concurrently south of Michigan Avenue as Cedar Street angles southeasterly. The two directions of BL I-96 merge at an interchange with I-496 that also marks the end of the Capitol Loop. South of this interchange, Cedar Street continues as a five-lane street through a commercial corridor on the south side of Lansing. The business loop crosses the Red Cedar River three blocks south of the I-496 interchange. On either side of the business loop, the adjacent neighborhoods are residential in character. South of an intersection with Jolly Road, Cedar Street starts angling southeasterly. BL I-96 ends at an indirect interchange with I-96 near the Edgewood Town Center.

When the state highway system was first signposted in 1919, the east–west highway across the Lower Peninsula through Lansing to Detroit was assigned the M-16 designation. M-16 was rerouted in the Lansing area in 1925, running along Grand River Avenue from Grand Ledge to East Lansing. The former routing through Downtown Lansing on Michigan Avenue became part of M-39. This was redesignated US 16 in 1926. With the completion of I-96 in between Lansing and Brighton, US 16 was decommissioned in Michigan in 1962. The former routing of US 16 on the north side of Lansing was redesignated as BL I-96. Through downtown, it followed the former US 27 on Larch Street. There, BL I-96 joined US 27 along a one-way pairing of Larch and Cedar streets. Where US 27 turned to join M-78 at Main Street, BL I-96 continued along US 127 along Cedar Street to terminate at I-96 south of the city at exit 104. In 1963, BL I-96 was rerouted onto the first portion of the I-496 freeway to be constructed southeast of the city. This rerouting would last until 1966 when it was transferred back to the original routing with the completion of the US 127 freeway between Lansing and Mason. BL I-96 was rerouted along M-43/Bus. M-78 to the I-496/M-78 freeway and back to I-96 at exit 106. Once the US 127 freeway was completed, BL I-96 was rerouted back along the former US 127 routing to I-96.

Major intersections

Howell

Business Loop Interstate 96 (BL I-96) is a business loop of I-96 through the city of Howell. The western terminus is at the M-59 interchange with I-96 northwest of Howell. BL I-96 runs concurrently with M-59 along a four-lane divided highway for about a  before turning southeasterly onto Grand River Avenue near the Livingston County Airport. The business loop passes through a residential neighborhood on the western side of Howell before entering downtown. In downtown, BL I-96 runs along a four-lane street and  meets the northern end of the unsigned M-155 at Michigan Avenue. Southeast  of downtown, the business loop passes through more residential areas before following a commercial corridor to a partial interchange with I-96 south of Lake Chemung.

When the state highway system was first signposted in 1919, the east–west highway across the Lower Peninsula through Howell to Detroit was assigned the M-16 designation. This was redesignated US 16 in 1926. In 1962, I-96 was completed between Lansing and Brighton, and US 16 was decommissioned in Michigan. At the time, a new limited-access connector road was constructed between I-96 and Grand River Avenue, providing access for the business loop and M-59 to I-96. Afterwards, the former route of US 16 along Grand River Avenue through Howell was redesignated BL I-96.

Major intersections

Farmington

Old Business Loop I-96 (Old BL I-96) is a  segment of unsigned state trunkline highway and was a former business loop of I-96 along Grand River Avenue through the city of Farmington. The western terminus is at the interchange between M-5 and Grand River Avenue west of the city. From there, the highway runs eastward through residential areas on the border of Farmington and Farmington Hills. At the intersection with Shiawasee Road, Grand River Avenue turns southeasterly into downtown Farmington. The highway is bounded by businesses from downtown southeasterly to its eastern terminus is at the intersection between M-5 and Grand River Avenue southeast of Farmington.

When the state highway system was first signposted in 1919, the east–west highway across the Lower Peninsula through Lansing to Detroit was assigned the M-16 designation. This highway was the original route of US 16 though downtown Farmington. In 1933, US 16 was routed onto a bypass route which had been constructed south of the city (the present-day Freedom Road) and the route through Farmington was retained as state trunkline. In 1956, a new bypass freeway was built just to the south of the old bypass as part of the Brighton–Farmington Expressway and the route through downtown was designated Business US 16. (Bus. US 16)

The original plans for I-96 called for it to replace US 16 and to run parallel to Grand River Avenue all the way from Farmington into downtown Detroit. In 1959, the Farmington bypass freeway was given the I-96 designation in addition to the US 16 moniker, and the business route was redesignated as BL I-96 two years later. In 1977, as the Jeffries Freeway was completed, I-96 was rerouted south through Livonia and then east into Detroit, the portion of freeway bypassing Farmington was redesignated M-102. Simultaneously, the BL I-96 designation through downtown Farmington was removed, and Grand River Avenue became an unsigned state trunkline, a status it has retained to this day.

Major intersections

Detroit

Old Business Spur I-96 (Old BS I-96) was the section of Grand River Avenue in Detroit between I-96 and the intersection with Cass Avenue and Middle Street in downtown Detroit and an unsigned state trunkline highway. It was previously a business spur of I-96. Picking up where M-5 ended at the interchange with I-96, Old BS I-96 followed Grand River Avenue southeasterly. The road itself was bounded by businesses as it passed through residential neighborhoods on Detroit's West Side. About a mile and three-quarters (2.8 km) along, the highway crossed I-96 again, and I-96 from here into the downtown area paralleled Grand River Avenue. Old BS I-96 here was mostly residential. It passed Bishop Park near Grand Boulevard and then crossed I-94. In the North Corktown neighborhood, Grand River Avenue crossed M-10 (Lodge Freeway) near the MotorCity Casino. About a half mile (0.7 km) past M-10, Old BS I-96 crossed I-75 (Fisher Freeway) and entered Downtown Detroit's Foxtown neighborhood. State maintenance ended at the five-way intersection between Grand River Avenue, Cass Avenue, and Middle Street. Grand River Avenue continued another five blocks to Woodward Avenue and another four blocks as it curved in an arc around Grand Circus Park.

When the state highway system was first signposted in 1919, the east–west highway across the Lower Peninsula through Grand Rapids and Lansing to Detroit was assigned the M-16 designation. The section of highway had previously been part of US 16. When US 16 was decommissioned in 1962, Grand River Avenue was redesignated BS I-96. Upon completion of I-96 (Jeffries Freeway) in Detroit in 1977, portions were re-designated M-102 and M-5. From I-96 southeast into downtown Detroit, Grand River Avenue remained under state control as an unsigned state trunkline highway. In 2004, the state transferred several blocks at the eastern end of Grand River Avenue to the City of Detroit. State jurisdiction now ended at the corner of Grand River Avenue, Middle Street, and Cass Avenue. In April–May 2016, a street light replacement project on Grand River Avenue ended Old BS I-96's status as a state trunkline highway as the project also included the installation of M-5 trailblazers along Old BS I-96's route.

Major intersections

See also

References

External links

Former BS I-96 in Portland at Michigan Highways

BL I-96 in Lansing at Michigan Highways

BL I-96 in Howell at Michigan Highways
Old BL I-96 in Farmington at Michigan Highways
Old BS I-96 in Detroit at Michigan Highways

Business
Grand River Avenue
U.S. Route 16
96 Business